The 1982 French Grand Prix was a Formula One motor race held at Paul Ricard on 25 July 1982. It was the eleventh race of the 1982 Formula One World Championship.

The 54-lap race was won from pole position by René Arnoux, driving a Renault. The turbocharged Renaults, Ferraris and Brabham-BMWs took up the first six grid positions, and Arnoux led home a French 1–2–3–4, with teammate Alain Prost second and the Ferraris of Didier Pironi and Patrick Tambay third and fourth respectively. However, Arnoux achieved his win in sour circumstances: he violated a pre-race agreement that if he and Prost were running first and second respectively, he would let Prost past to aid his Drivers' Championship hopes. Arnoux would leave Renault at the end of the year.

The top six was completed by Keke Rosberg in the Williams-Ford and Michele Alboreto in the Tyrrell-Ford. Pironi's third place enabled him to extend his lead in the Drivers' Championship to nine points, though this would turn out to be his last finish before his career-ending accident at the next race in Germany.

The eleventh lap of this race saw a big accident when Jochen Mass's March and Mauro Baldi's Arrows collided at Signes. Mass's car went through the catch fencing into the tyre walls, then catapulted into a spectator area and caught fire. Mass escaped with burns on his hands, while several spectators were injured. The West German driver retired from Formula One immediately after this race.

Classification

Qualifying

Race

Championship standings after the race

Drivers' Championship standings

Constructors' Championship standings

References

French Grand Prix
French Grand Prix
Grand Prix